The 150th New York Infantry Regiment was an infantry regiment in the Union Army during the American Civil War. It was mustered in October 10, 1862, and mustered out June 8, 1865.

Recruiting areas
A Company: Poughkeepsie, Amenia, Washington, and Pleasant Valley
B Company: Poughkeepsie
C Company: Clinton, Stanford, Pleasant Valley, Poughkeepsie, and Washington
D Company: Hyde Park, Pine Plains, North East, Poughkeepsie, and Rhinebeck
E Company: Dover, Pawling, and Poughkeepsie
F Company: Poughkeepsie, Rhinebeck, Red Hook, and Milan
G Company: Poughkeepsie, Beekman, Union Vale, and Fishkill
H Company: Poughkeepsie, Hyde Park, and Clinton
I Company: Poughkeepsie, Stanford, LaGrange, Amenia, and Union Vale
K Company: Rhinebeck, Poughkeepsie, and Fishkill

Field officers
Colonels: John H. Ketcham, Alfred B. Smith
Lieutenant Colonels: Charles G. Bartlett, Alfred B. Smith, Joseph H. Cogswell
Majors: Alfred B. Smith, Joseph H. Cogswell, Henry A. Gildersleeve

Battle record
Gettysburg Campaign
Atlanta Campaign
Battle of Resaca
Battle of Adairsville
Battle of Dallas
Battle of Kennesaw Mountain
Battle of Peachtree Creek
Siege of Atlanta
March to the sea
Carolinas Campaign
Battle of Averasboro
Battle of Bentonville

Casualties
The regiment sustained 41 officers and men killed and mortally wounded, 116 wounded but recovered, and 40 missing or captured, for a total of 207 casualties.

References 

Infantry 150
Military units and formations established in 1862
Military units and formations disestablished in 1865
1862 establishments in New York (state)